Wang Ye worship is a Fujianese and Taiwanese folk religion, frequently considered an aspect of the Taoist belief system. Wang Ye is particularly worshipped in Southern Taiwan and also among Minnan speaking communities worldwide.

The customary belief is that Wang Ye, are Divine Emissaries who tour the world of the living on behalf of the Celestial Imperial Order, expelling disease and evil from those who worship and seek their divine grace. Such "inspection tours" take place on a regular cycle of a set number of years, usually three years but may varies at different region.

Origins of Wang Ye worship

Wang Ye worship stems from belief in two main categories of supernatural beings, both of which are spirits of what were once, according to legend, real human beings with selfless attitude and noble character. 

The first category of Wang Ye belief began with the legend of a kind-hearted intellectual who sacrificed himself by committing suicide in a well that contained toxic water, in order to prevent the villagers from drinking the well water and thus avoided any pestilence or plague from spreading. Therefore, to stop diseases, like pestilence, from spreading, people would honoured and make offerings to those beings who sacrificed their own lives for the civilians and public well-being. As time passed by, these great people are honored as Wang Ye and gradually became local Guardian Deities that are able to dispelling epidemic and diseases, and bestow blessings and good fortune.

The second category comprises national heroes who are bestowed with the status of Deity by the Celestial appointment of Jade Emperor due to their heroic deeds and great sacrifices in their lives. An example is the spirit of Koxinga, thus honored for his role in defending and protecting Han Chinese against the Qing invading forces in China and the Dutch colonial forces in Taiwan.

The Wang Ye

There are many Wang Ye: some traditions claim there are a total of 360, with 132 surnames among them.

Wang Ye festivals

Wang Ye festivals are grand religious celebrations that take place in various parts of Taiwan, mostly in the south. They generally involve processions of Deities throughout the region to inspect and ward off any deadly diseases and evil presence, while bestow blessings with good fortune for the inhabitants in the particular region, and the celebration will complete with the burning or launch of a replica boat to send off the "Divine Emissaries" to heaven.

One of the grandest Wang Ye's festivals in Taiwan takes place in Donglong Temple (東港東隆宮) which is located in the city of Donggang, Pingtung County, once every three years. The 2009 festival began on October 10 and culminated in the early morning of October 17, when a wooden boat would be processed in the area and sent off while set on fire on the beach indicating the Deities heading back to the Heaven.

The Nankunshen Daitian Temple, considered one of the Wang Ye's founding temple, was built in 1817 and is located in Beimen, Tainan.

References

Deities in Taoism
Deities in Chinese folk religion
Religion in Fujian
Religion in Taiwan
Hokkien Taoism
Taiwanese folk religion
Supernatural legends
Traditions involving fire